Bradley Alexander Pinion (born June 1, 1994) is an American football punter and kickoff specialist for the Atlanta Falcons of the National Football League (NFL). He played college football at Clemson and was drafted by the San Francisco 49ers in the fifth round of the 2015 NFL Draft.

Early years
Pinion attended Northwest Cabarrus High School in Concord, North Carolina. He committed to Clemson University to play college football.

College career
Pinion played college football at Clemson from 2012 to 2014 under head coach Dabo Swinney.

As a freshman in the 2012 season, Pinion only appeared in five games with teammate Spencer Benton doing a majority of the work that season. On September 8, he made his collegiate debut in the 52–27 win over Ball State. In the game, he had three punts for 117 net yards (39.0 average). Overall, in the 2012 season, he recorded nine punts for 355 net yards (39.4 average).

As a sophomore in the 2013 season, Pinion became the main punter for the Tigers. That season, he handled the punting duties for all but three attempts, which went to Ammon Lakip and Andy Teasdall. In the season opener, against the Georgia Bulldogs, Pinion had a season-high seven punts for a season-high 287 net yards (41.0 average). In the next game, against South Carolina State, he had four punts for 195 net yards for a season-high 48.8 average.
 Overall, in the 2013 season, he had 56 punts for 2,205 net yards for a 39.4 average.

As a junior in the 2014 season, Pinion continued his role as the main punter for the Tigers. That season, he handled all but one punt, which went to Andy Teasdall. He attempted and converted three extra points on the season. In the season opener, against the Georgia Bulldogs, Pinion had a season-high ten punts for a season-high 451 net yards (45.1 average). In two consecutive games in October, against Louisville and Boston College, he recorded games with 10 punts in each contest with 419 and 418 net punting yards respectively. On November 6, against Wake Forest, he recorded three punts for 147 net yards for a season-high 49.0 average. In his final collegiate game, against the Oklahoma Sooners in the Russell Athletic Bowl, he recorded five punts for 217 net yards (43.4 average).  Throughout his junior season, teammates referred to Pinion as "the steering column" for his remarkable control over the direction of his punts. Pinion elected to forgo his senior season and decided to enter the NFL Draft.

College statistics

Professional career

San Francisco 49ers
Pinion was drafted by the San Francisco 49ers in the fifth round, 165th overall, of the 2015 NFL Draft. He was the only punter to be selected in the draft that year.

2015 season: Rookie year
In the season opener against the Minnesota Vikings, Pinion had three punts for 140 net yards (46.67 average) in his NFL debut. In Week 9, against the Atlanta Falcons, he recorded five punts for 241 net yards for a season-high 48.20 average. In Week 13, against the Chicago Bears, he recorded 9 punts for a season-high 433 net yards (48.11 average).

Pinion finished his rookie season with 91 punts for 3,969 net yards for a 43.62 average.

2016 season
Pinion began his second NFL season with very similar statistics in the first 3 games. In the season opener, against the Los Angeles Rams, he recorded seven punts for 319 net yards (45.57 average) in the 28–0 shutout victory. In the next game against the Carolina Panthers, he recorded seven punts for 318 net yards (45.43 average) in the 46–27 road loss. The following week against the Seattle Seahawks, he recorded seven punts for 319 net yards in the 37–18 road loss.

During Week 5 against the Arizona Cardinals, he recorded seven punts for 349 net yards for a season-high 49.86 average in the 33–21 loss. In Week 16, in the second divisional game against the Rams, Pinion recorded a season-high nine punts for a season-high 372 net yards (41.33 average) in the narrow 22–21 road victory.

Pinion finished his second professional season with 100 punts for 4,402 net yards for a 44.02 average in 2016. His 100 punts led the league in attempts.

2017 season

Pinion remained as the 49ers' punter going into his third professional season. During a Week 4 18–15 overtime road loss to the Arizona Cardinals, he recorded seven punts for 351 net yards for a season-high 50.14 average. During Week 8 against the Philadelphia Eagles, he recorded eight punts for a season-high 364 net yards (44.00 average) in the 33–10 road loss. During a Week 12 24–13 loss to the Seattle Seahawks, Pinion recorded a season-high nine punts for 342 net yards (38.00 average). Pinion recorded a then career-low 75 punts for 3,255 net yards for a 43.4 average in 2017.

2018 season
During the season opener against the Minnesota Vikings, Pinion recorded four punts for 174 yards in the 24–16 road loss. In a Week 9 37–3 victory over the Oakland Raiders, Pinion recorded three punts for 164 net yards for a 54.7 average, including a season-long 64-yard punt. His performance against the Raiders earned him NFC Special Teams Player of the Week. Pinion recorded a then career-low 68 punts for 2,973 net yards for a 43.7 average in 2018.

Tampa Bay Buccaneers

2019 season
On March 13, 2019, Pinion signed a four-year contract with the Tampa Bay Buccaneers. Overall, Pinion played in all 16 games and recorded a then career-low 57 punts for 2,464 net yards for a 43.23 average in 2019.

2020 season
Pinion was placed on the reserve/COVID-19 list by the team on December 15, 2020, and activated three days later. Overall, Pinion played in all 16 games and recorded a career-low 55 punts for 2,486 net yards for a 45.2 average in 2020. He appeared in Super Bowl LV against the Kansas City Chiefs. He punted four times for 150 net yards for a 37.5 net average in the 31–9 victory.

2021 season
During the season-opening 31-29 victory over the Dallas Cowboys, Pinion punted four times with an average of 49.3 yards, including three inside the 10-yard line, earning NFC Special Teams Player of the Week honors. In the 2021 season, Pinion punted 56 times for 2,378 net yards for a 42.46 average.

On June 22, 2022, Pinion was released by the Buccaneers.

Atlanta Falcons
On June 30, 2022, Pinion signed with the Atlanta Falcons. He then signed a three-year, $8.65 million contract extension on March 13, 2023.

NFL career statistics

Personal life
Pinion is married to Kaeleigh Pinion. He is a Christian.

Pinion is a supporter of Compassion International.

References

External links 
 Atlanta Falcons bio
 Clemson Tigers bio

1994 births
Living people
Players of American football from North Carolina
People from Concord, North Carolina
American football punters
Clemson Tigers football players
San Francisco 49ers players
Tampa Bay Buccaneers players
Atlanta Falcons players